Indian Ridge is a  mountain located in Jasper National Park, in the Trident Range of the Canadian Rockies of Alberta, Canada. The summit is unofficially called Indian Peak. The peak is composed of sedimentary rock laid down from the Precambrian to the Jurassic periods and pushed east and over the top of younger rock during the Laramide orogeny.

History
The peak was named in 1916 by Morrison P. Bridgland because of its reddish colored rock. Bridgland (1878–1948), was a Dominion Land Surveyor who named many peaks in Jasper Park and the Canadian Rockies. The mountain's name was officially adopted in 1951 by the Geographical Names Board of Canada.

Climate
Based on the Köppen climate classification, Indian Ridge is located in a subarctic climate zone with cold, snowy winters, and mild summers. Winter temperatures can drop below  with wind chill factors below . Precipitation runoff from Indian Ridge drains into tributaries of the Miette River and Athabasca River.

See also
 
 Geography of Alberta

Gallery

References

External links
 Parks Canada web site: Jasper National Park

Two-thousanders of Alberta
Mountains of Jasper National Park
Canadian Rockies